James Odongo Oduka (born 4 December 1944) is a Ugandan sprinter. He competed in the men's 100 metres at the 1964 Summer Olympics.

References

External links
 

1944 births
Living people
Athletes (track and field) at the 1964 Summer Olympics
Ugandan male sprinters
Olympic athletes of Uganda
Athletes (track and field) at the 1962 British Empire and Commonwealth Games
Commonwealth Games competitors for Uganda
Place of birth missing (living people)